Scott McBain is a pseudonym of a Scottish fiction writer.

McBain was born in Stirling, Scotland in June 1960. He lived in Girvan on the west coast of Scotland until 1969; he moved to England after his parents' divorce.

He graduated from Peterhouse, Cambridge, mastering in law. In the years from 1986 to 1987 he received a Fulbright scholarship and studied at Harvard University.

McBain lives in Panama and is married to a local.

Work 
The Mastership Game (2000), 
The Coins of Judas (2001), 
 The Final Solution (2005), HarperCollins, London, no release to date,
 German edition released as "Der Mastercode"

External links and references
http://www.harpercollins.com.au/authors/50015981/Scott_McBain/index.aspx?authorID=50015981
 http://www.authortracker.ca/author.asp?a=authorid&b=uk_3808 (Engl.)

1960 births
Living people
Alumni of Peterhouse, Cambridge
Harvard University alumni
Scottish writers
People from Stirling